Rachel Hannen (born 27 January 1995 in Edinburgh, Scotland) is a Scottish curler.

Teams

Women's

Mixed

Mixed doubles

Personal life
Her mother Isobel is a 1985 World silver medallist curler and also coaches.

References

External links

Rachel Hannen - British Universities & Colleges Sport (web archive)
Rachel Hannen Athlete Profile - British Curling (.DOCX)
Curling: Rachel Hannen - Winning Students
Hamilton curling ace Rachel Hannen sets her sights on Sweden - Daily Record (14 oct 2017)
Rachel Hannen - Tags - The Roaring Game Blog

Living people
1995 births
Curlers from Edinburgh
Scottish female curlers
Competitors at the 2017 Winter Universiade
Curlers at the 2012 Winter Youth Olympics